Obol may refer to:

 Obol (coin), a type of silver coin used in Ancient Greece
 Obol, an occasional name for the halfpenny (British pre-decimal coin)
 Obol (town), a town in Belarus
 Obol (river), a river in Belarus
 Obol Investment, a Swedish company involved in a major fraud scandal
 Obol Basketball League, former name of the Swedish Basketball League when it signed an agreement with the company